Arjun Sethi may refer to:

Pandit Arjun Lal Sethi (born 1880), revolutionary, politician and educator
Arjun Charan Sethi (born 1941), Indian politician and presently a member of the BJD political party
Arjun Singh Sethi (born 1981), Indian American civil rights writer and lawyer
Arjun Sethi (entrepreneur) (born 1983), American Internet entrepreneur, investor and executive